Panadura is a city in Kalutara District, Western Province in Sri Lanka. Panadura is famed as the location of important events in the Buddhist revival movement of Sri Lanka.

Panadura Debate 
The Panadura Debate, held in 1873, was the climax of the first phase of the Buddhist revivalist movement which began with the establishment of the Society for the Propagation of Buddhism at Kotahena and the establishment of the Lankopakara Press in Galle. The two key persons in the Panadura Debate were Migettuwatte Gunananda Thera and Father David de Silva and the two key institutions were the Rankoth Viharaya and the Methodist Church of Panadura. It was the success of the Panadura Debate that prompted Colonel Henry Steel Olcott to come to Ceylon.

Demographics 
Panadura is a multi-cultural and multi-ethnic city. The Sinhalese make the majority in the city. Muslims are the second largest group in the city. Others include Sri Lankan Tamils, small numbers of Indian Tamils, Burgher and Malay.

Ethnicity in Panadura 
Source:statistics.gov.lk.

Transport

Road 
Pandura is located at the junction of the A2 (Galle Road) and the A8 (Panadura-Ratnapura Road).

Rail
Panadura railway station is located to the east of the town, and is located on the Coastal line.

Bus
Due to Panadura being situated along Galle Road, it is serviced by many bus routes terminating at Panadura as well as ones heading further south.

Health care facilities
"Kethumathi" is the fourth largest hospital in the country, dedicated for Obstetrics and Gynecology. It is situated at the centre of Panadura,  from the A2 road. This hospital is a comprehensive with neonatal ICU and has a 300 bed capacity. A grade-1 Base hospital situated near the Panadura police station facing A2 road. Apart from this there are wide range of health care facilities run by the Government. There is an Ayurvedic Treatment Centre in Pallimulla, Panadura.

Public and private schools
Sri Sumangala College
Sri Sumangala Balika Maha Vidyalaya
St. John's College Panadura
Lyceum International School Panadura
Leeds International School Panadura
Walana Mahanama Maha Vidyalaya
Agamathi Balika Vidyalaya Panadura
Bauddhaloka Maha Vidyalaya Panadura
Good Shepherd Convent Pandura
Panadura Balika Vidyalaya Panadura
Panadura Royal College
Nalluruwa Siri Seevali Maha Vidyalaya
St Anthony’s Boys School
St Anthony’s Girls School
Pinwatta Maha Vidyalaya
Jeelan Central College (National School) 
Jeramies Dias Kanishta Vidyalaya
Kuruppumulla Sri Prakrama Vidyalaya
Dibbedda Gunawardena Kanishta Vidyalaya
Upadya Kanishta Vidyalaya
Bekkegama Kanishta Vidyalaya
Methodis’t Primary School
Malamulla Maha Vidyalaya
Thotawatta Al Fahriya central Muslim madya maha vidyalaya
Ikra international College
House Of Scholars
Ambalanduwa Ilma Muslim Vidyalaya

Notable individuals
 Celestina Dias - Entrepreneur and philanthropist 
 Prof.Gunapala Piyasena Malalasekera - Sri Lankan academic, scholar and diplomat
 Dr.Premasiri Khemadasa - Music director, composer
 Arthur V. Dias - A planter by profession he is known as "Kos Mama"
 Dr.Nalin de Silva - Theoretical physicist, philosopher and a political analyst.
 Prof.Ravindra Fernando- Forensic Pathologist, Toxicologist Physician, author and academic.
 Leslie Goonewardene (MP)-  One of the founders of the Lanka Sama Samaja Party
 Wilmot A. Perera - Statesman and Diplomat
 Prasanna Vithanage - Film Director
 Ravindra Pushpakumara - International Cricketer
 Charitha Buddhika - International Cricketer
 Chamara Silva - International Cricketer
 Don Anurasiri - International Cricketer
 Dilruwan Perera - International Cricketer
 Akila Dananjaya - International Cricketer
 Mohomed Dilshad -first class cricketer

References

External links 
 Article on Colonel Olcott, Panadura and the revival of Buddhism in Sri Lanka

 
Populated places in Western Province, Sri Lanka